The Czech Records in Swimming are the fastest times ever swum by a swimmer representing the Czech Republic. These records are kept/maintained by the Czech Swimming Federation (Český svaz plaveckých sportů) (ČSPS).

Records are recognized for males and females in the following long course (50 m) and short course (25 m) events:
 freestyle: 50, 100, 200, 400, 800 and 1500 m
 backstroke: 50, 100 and 200 m
 breaststroke: 50, 100 and 200 m
 butterfly: 50, 100 and 200 m
 individual medley): 100 m (25 m only), 200 and 400 m
 relays: 4x50 m free (25 m only), 4x100 m free, 4x200 m free, 4x50 m medley (25 m only), and 4x100 m medley
Note: In the relay events, all records are by Czech club teams, and not by Czech national teams.

All records were set in finals unless noted otherwise.

Long course (50 m)

Men

|-bgcolor=#DDDDDD
|colspan=9|
|-

|-bgcolor=#DDDDDD
|colspan=9|
|-

|-bgcolor=#DDDDDD
|colspan=9|
|-

|-bgcolor=#DDDDDD
|colspan=9|
|-

|-bgcolor=#DDDDDD
|colspan=9|
|-

Nation team times in relays
These appear to be the fastest times swum by Czech national relays at events; however, these times are not listed by CSPS as Czech records. (They have also not been verified as the fastest times.)

Women

|-bgcolor=#DDDDDD
|colspan=9|
|-

|-bgcolor=#DDDDDD
|colspan=9|
|-

|-bgcolor=#DDDDDD
|colspan=9|
|-

|-bgcolor=#DDDDDD
|colspan=9|
|-

|-bgcolor=#DDDDDD
|colspan=9|
|-

Nation team times in relays
These appear to be the fastest times swum by Czech national relays at events; however, these times are not listed by CSPS as the Czech Records. (They have also not been verified as the fastest times.)

Mixed relay

Short Course (25 m)

Men

|-bgcolor=#DDDDDD
|colspan=9|
|-

|-bgcolor=#DDDDDD
|colspan=9|
|-

|-bgcolor=#DDDDDD
|colspan=9|
|-

|-bgcolor=#DDDDDD
|colspan=9|
|-

|-bgcolor=#DDDDDD
|colspan=9|
|-

Nation team times in relays
These appear to be the fastest times swum by Czech national relays at events; however, these times are not listed by CSPS as the Czech Records. (They have also not been verified as the fastest times.)

Women

|-bgcolor=#DDDDDD
|colspan=9|
|-

|-bgcolor=#DDDDDD
|colspan=9|
|-

|-bgcolor=#DDDDDD
|colspan=9|
|-

|-bgcolor=#DDDDDD
|colspan=9|
|-

|-bgcolor=#DDDDDD
|colspan=9|
|-

Nation team times in relays
These appear to be the fastest times swum by Czech national relays at events; however, these times are not listed by CSPS as the Czech Records. (They have also not been verified as the fastest times.)

Mixed relay

Notes

References
General
Czech records 18 December 2022 updated
Specific

External links
Český svaz plaveckých sportů web site

Czech Republic
Records
Swimming
Swimming